Rushden Cavalcade is a 3-day event run by the Rushden Historical Transport Society (RHTS).

The Cavalcade of transport and country fair is traditionally held over the May Bank Holiday on a field just south of Rushden. The funds help the development of the old Rushden railway station run by the Society and the expansion of the railway activities.
It is held in many Fields in Avenue road, Rushden just off the A6 Bedford.

See also
Rushden, Higham & Wellingborough Railway
Rushden Historical Transport Society

External links
 Cavalcade Website

Rushden
Fairs in England
Festivals in Northamptonshire